Dejan Vokić (born 12 June 1996) is a Slovenian professional footballer who plays as a midfielder for Italian  club Benevento.

Career
On 13 February 2019, Vokić signed a -year contract with Italian Serie B club Benevento.

On 5 October 2020, he joined Pescara on loan.

On 18 January 2022, he moved on loan to Pordenone until the end of the season.

Career statistics

Club

Notes

Honours
Maribor
Slovenian PrvaLiga: 2014–15
Slovenian Cup: 2015–16

Maribor B
Slovenian Third League: 2014–15

References

External links
 NZS profile 
 

 

1996 births
Living people
Slovenian footballers
Slovenia youth international footballers
Slovenia under-21 international footballers
Slovenian expatriate footballers
Association football midfielders
Slovenian PrvaLiga players
Slovenian Second League players
Ekstraklasa players
Serie B players
NK Maribor players
NK Krško players
NK Triglav Kranj players
Benevento Calcio players
Zagłębie Sosnowiec players
Delfino Pescara 1936 players
Pordenone Calcio players
Slovenian expatriate sportspeople in Poland
Expatriate footballers in Poland
Slovenian expatriate sportspeople in Italy
Expatriate footballers in Italy